{{Taxobox
| image = Dalophis cephalopeltis.jpg
| regnum = Animalia
| phylum = Chordata
| classis = Actinopterygii
| ordo = Anguilliformes
| familia = Ophichthidae
| genus = Dalophis
| species = D. cephalopeltis
| binomial = Dalophis cephalopeltis
| binomial_authority = (Bleeker, 1863)
| synonyms_ref = 
| synonyms = * Sphagebranchus cephalopeltis Bleeker, 1863
 Caecula cephalopeltis' (Bleeker, 1863)
 Ophichthys buettikoferi Steindachner, 1894
 Ophichthys buttikoferi Steindachner, 1894
}}Dalophis cephalopeltis'' is an eel in the family Ophichthidae (worm/snake eels)  first described by Peiter Bleeker in 1863. It is a tropical, marine eel which is known to inhabit the Eastern Atlantic near the coast of western Africa. It lives in estuaries and rivers, and forms burrows in sand or mud. Males have been recorded to reach a maximum total length of 53.5 centimetres.

References

Ophichthidae
Fish described in 1863